Nikolay Diletsky (Mykola Dyletsky, Nikolay Pavlovich Diletsky, Nikolai Diletskii, also Mikolaj Dylecki, Nikolai Dilezki, etc.; c. 1630, Kyiv – after 1680, Moscow) was a music theorist and composer born in the Kyiv Voivodeship of the Polish-Lithuanian Commonwealth and active in Russia. He was widely influential in late 17th-century Russia with his treatise on musical composition, A Musical Grammar, of which the earliest surviving version dates from 1677. Diletsky's followers included the Russian composer Vasily Titov.

Life

Little is known about Diletsky's life. A remark by Ioannikii Trofimovich Korenev, a fellow theorist who describes him as a resident of Kyiv, is considered evidence of Diletsky's Ukrainian origins. Korenev's statement is probably reliable, as he and Diletsky apparently were well acquainted. However, the date and even the year of birth are not known, and no details on Diletsky's early life have surfaced. He must have moved to Vilnius before 1675, because that year his Toga zlota ("The golden toga") was published there. The text is now lost, but it is known that it was written in Polish, and the surviving title page indicates that it was probably a panegyrical pamphlet. Some sources indicate that he wrote at least one other musical treatise while in Vilnius, which is now lost: this treatise is first mentioned in Grammatika musikiyskago peniya (1677), and the Idea grammatikii musikiiskoi (1679) is described as a translation of the Vilnius work in its title page.

After Vilnius, Diletsky lived in Smolensk, where in 1677 the first surviving version of his magnum opus, Grammatika musikiyskago peniya ("A grammar of musical song"), was written. He then moved to Moscow, where the subsequent two versions of the work appeared in 1679 and 1681. Nothing further is known about Diletsky's life, and it is generally assumed that he died shortly afterwards. His date of birth is projected from this hypothesis.

Work

Although several of his compositions survive, Diletsky's fame rests chiefly on his composition treatise, Grammatika musikiyskago peniya (A Grammar of Music[al Singing]), which was the first of its kind in Russia. The three surviving versions bear different names, but the content is roughly the same with some important differences. The treatise is in two parts. The first teaches the rudiments of music theory, "relying heavily on Western terminology and theoretical precepts, especially the hexachord", and the second teaches composition of a cappella concertos, a genre that came to Russia through Ukraine and of which Diletsky was one of the first exponents. Diletsky provides a wide variety of examples, both from his own work, including an 8-voice setting of the Divine Liturgy that he composed in Smolensk specifically to illustrate the Grammatika, and from that of contemporary Western composers, particularly the Poles Marcin Mielczewski and Jacek Różycki. Apart from the tremendous influence it had on subsequent generations of Russian church composers, the Grammatika is of particular interest for having the first known description of the circle of fifths, one that antedates Western examples by several decades.

List of works

Writings
Grammatika musikiyskago peniya (Грамматика муcикийского пения, "A grammar of musical song", Smolensk, 1677)
Idea grammatikii musikiyskoy (Идея грамматикии муcикийской, "An idea of musical grammar", Moscow, 1679)
Grammatika peniya musikiyskago (Грамматика пения муcикийского, Moscow, 1681)

Music
3 settings of the Divine Liturgy (4–8 voices, includes "Kievan Chant" and a "Proportional" liturgy)
2 sacred concertos
Resurrection/Easter kanon, 8vv

Notes

Sources
 

Dytyniak Maria Ukrainian Composers – A Bio-bibliographic Guide – Research report No. 14, 1896, Canadian Institute of Ukrainian Studies, University of Alberta, Canada.

1630 births
17th-century deaths
Year of birth uncertain
Year of death unknown
Ukrainian Baroque composers
Classical composers of church music
Russian classical composers
Russian male classical composers
Russian music theorists
Ukrainian classical composers
17th-century classical composers
Russian Baroque composers
17th-century male musicians